Denis Bauda (born 26 February 1947) is a French former professional football player and manager.

Club career 
Bauda played in each of the first three divisions of French football in a career lasting from 1964 to 1979. He played for Grenoble, Metz, Bastia, Nancy, Paris Saint-Germain, and Poissy as a player.

A notable first that Bauda set in his playing days was that he became the first player to be shown a red card in the Division 1 in Paris Saint-Germain's history.

International career 
Bauda was a U21 and military international for France. He made one appearance for the France B team in 1973.

Managerial career 
During the 1979–80 season, Bauda coached . He was in charge for 26 matches and had a win percentage of 35%.

References

External links 
 

1947 births
Living people
French footballers
Association football midfielders
French football managers
Sportspeople from Grenoble
Grenoble Foot 38 players
FC Metz players
SC Bastia players
AS Nancy Lorraine players
Paris Saint-Germain F.C. players
AS Poissy players
Ligue 2 players
Ligue 1 players
Championnat National players
France under-21 international footballers
France youth international footballers
France B international footballers
Footballers from Auvergne-Rhône-Alpes